Laurikainen is a Finnish surname. Notable people with the surname include:

Eetu Laurikainen (born 1993), Finnish ice hockey player
Joonas Laurikainen (born 1983), Finnish footballer
Mika Laurikainen (born 1963), Finnish footballer

Finnish-language surnames